The Isle of Wight Festival 2006 was the fifth revived Isle of Wight Festival on the Seaclose Park site in Newport on the Isle of Wight. It took place between 9 and 11 June 2006. The attendance was around 55,000 and the event was dubbed the biggest festival in England, because Glastonbury was on its break year. It was the last of three consecutive years of Nokia sponsorship, which saw the likes of The Who, David Bowie and R.E.M. grace the Island stage.

New additions to the festival site included the Bandstand, which allowed local bands to perform, the Carling warm beer amnesty and the Strawberry fields a large area of bars and music venues. The festival achieved island-wide promotion by displaying the 2006 logo on Isle of Wight service buses. These buses were used to shuttle festival goers to a commemorative statue of Jimi Hendrix at Dimbola Lodge in Freshwater Bay near Afton Down (where the 1970 festival was staged).

The festival was filmed and highlights were shown on late night broadcasts on Channel 4. Notable moments included Coldplay covering Lou Reed's 1972 song 'Perfect Day' during their Sunday night headline performance after the ex-Velvet Underground frontman failed to play it in his 'unpredictable' set earlier in the day. Coldplay singer Chris Martin told media that Lou Reed had asked them to do the cover to 'placate the crowd'. The Sunday also saw Procol Harum return to the festival for the first time since they played at the original version of the festival in 1970.

Line Up

Friday
 The Prodigy
 Placebo
 Goldfrapp
 The Rakes
 Morning Runner

Saturday
 Foo Fighters
 Primal Scream
 Editors
 Dirty Pretty Things
 The Kooks
 The Proclaimers
 Suzanne Vega
 The Upper Room
 747's
 The On Offs

Sunday
 Coldplay
 Richard Ashcroft
 Lou Reed
 Maxïmo Park
 Kubb
 Procol Harum
 Delays
 Marjorie Fair
 CatHead
 The Windows
 Skyline Heroes

References

External links 
Isle of Wight Festival

2006
2006 in British music
2006 in England
21st century on the Isle of Wight